MCMLXX is an album by American jazz pianist Ray Bryant released on the Atlantic label in 1970.

Reception

AllMusic reviewer Scott Yanow stated: "The colorful results are not essential but are less dated than one might think".

Track listing
All compositions by Ray Bryant, except as indicated
 "Stick with It" - 5:51
 "Let It Be"  (John Lennon, Paul McCartney) - 4:01
 "Bridge over Troubled Water" (Paul Simon) - 3:20
 "Hey Jude" (Lennon, McCartney) - 4:50
 "Shake-a-Lady" - 2:38
 "Unchained Melody" (Alex North, Hy Zaret) - 4:45
 "My Cherie Amour" (Henry Cosby, Stevie Wonder, Sylvia Moy) - 4:56
 "Spinning Wheel" (David Clayton-Thomas) - 3:39
Recorded at Atlantic Studios on March 4 (tracks 4 & 8), March 5 (track 7), March 18 (tracks 1, 5 & 6) and April 14 (tracks 2 & 3), 1970

Personnel 
Ray Bryant - piano
Chuck Rainey - electric bass
Jimmy Johnson  - drums
Joe Newman - trumpet (track 2)
Garnett Brown - trombone (track 2) 
George Dorsey - alto saxophone (track 2) 
King Curtis (track 2), Joe Gentle (tracks 1, 3 & 4) - tenor saxophone 
Leon Cohen - bass clarinet (tracks 1, 3 & 4)
Pepper Adams - baritone saxophone (track 2) 
Emanuel Green, Gene Orloff, Joseph Malignaggi, Julien Barber, Matthew Raimondi, Noel Dacosta, Paul Gershman, Selwart Clarke, Winston Collymore - violin (tracks 1, 3 & 4)
Charles McCracken - cello (tracks 1, 3 & 4)
Ron Carter - acoustic bass (tracks 1, 3 & 4) 
Eumir Deodato (tracks 1, 3 & 4), Arif Mardin (track 2) - arranger

References 

1970 albums
Ray Bryant albums
Atlantic Records albums
Albums produced by Joel Dorn